"Party of Special Things to Do" is a song by Captain Beefheart from the album Bluejeans & Moonbeams (1974). It was covered and released as a 7" single by Detroit garage rock band the White Stripes. Their 7" record also contains two other covers of Captain Beefheart who, among others, was an inspirational catalyst in the creation of Jack White's distinct musical sound. The recording was released in December 2000 as part of the Sub Pop Singles Club in a limited edition pressing of 1,300 copies on half-red, half-white vinyl.

"Party of Special Things to Do" was reissued by Third Man Records in early 2011 as a part of their Vault subscription service. The limited edition 7" record was pressed as a tri-color record in equal parts red, black and white.

Track listing

References

2000 singles
The White Stripes songs
Captain Beefheart songs
Songs written by Captain Beefheart
1974 songs
Wikipedia requested audio of songs